This is a list of Members of Parliament elected at the 1970 general election, held on 18 June.

Composition
These representative diagrams show the composition of the parties in the 1970 general election.

Note: This is not the official seating plan of the House of Commons, which has five rows of benches on each side, with the government party to the right of the Speaker and opposition parties to the left, but with room for only around two-thirds of MPs to sit at any one time.

This is a list of Members of Parliament elected to the Parliament of the United Kingdom in the 1970 general election held on 18 June.

Notable newcomers to the House of Commons included John Prescott, Norman Tebbit, Ian Paisley, John Smith, Neil Kinnock, Kenneth Clarke, John Gummer, Alan Haselhurst, Dennis Skinner, and Gerald Kaufman.



By-elections
See the list of United Kingdom by-elections.

See also
:Category:UK MPs 1970-1974

1970
General election
 
UK MPs